Bölscheøya is an island southwest of Negerpynten, the southeastern point of Edgeøya. It is part of Thousand Islands. The island was named in 1868 by the German geographer August Petermann (1822–78) after the German journalist Carl Bölsche, father of the German writer and zoologist Wilhelm Bölsche (1843–93). The remains of a whaling station (probably Dutch) from the 17th century can be found on the island.

References

 Norwegian Polar Institute: Place names in Norwegian polar areas
 Bölsche-Lexikon 

Islands of Svalbard
Whaling stations in Norway
Whaling in Norway
Whaling in the Dutch Republic
Former populated places in Svalbard